Sivanesania is a genus of fungi in the family Botryosphaeriaceae for which there is the sole species Sivanesania rubi.

References

External links
Index Fungorum

Botryosphaeriales